The Little Suncook River is a  river in central New Hampshire in the United States. It is a tributary of the Suncook River, part of the Merrimack River (and therefore Gulf of Maine) watershed.

The Little Suncook begins at the outlet of Northwood Lake in the town of Epsom. Flowing west, it passes through Bixby Pond (also known as Cass Pond), passes the villages of Epsom and Gossville, and joins the Suncook River near the Epsom Traffic Circle.

U.S. Route 4 parallels the Little Suncook for the river's entire length.

See also

List of rivers of New Hampshire

References

Tributaries of the Merrimack River
Rivers of New Hampshire
Rivers of Merrimack County, New Hampshire